Echinolampas is a genus of echinoderms belonging to the family Echinolampadidae.

The genus has cosmopolitan distribution.

Species:

Echinolampas africana 
Echinolampas aldrichi 
Echinolampas alexandri 
Echinolampas altissima 
Echinolampas anceps 
Echinolampas andalusiensis 
Echinolampas anguillae 
Echinolampas antunesi 
Echinolampas appendiculatus 
Echinolampas atascaderensis 
Echinolampas atropha 
Echinolampas barcensis 
Echinolampas bastai 
Echinolampas bombos 
Echinolampas bonomii 
Echinolampas bothriopygoides 
Echinolampas brachytona 
Echinolampas camagueyensis 
Echinolampas caranoi 
Echinolampas castroi 
Echinolampas cavaionensis 
Echinolampas checchiai 
Echinolampas chiesai 
Echinolampas chuni 
Echinolampas clevei 
Echinolampas cojimarensis 
Echinolampas complanatus 
Echinolampas concavus 
Echinolampas consolationis 
Echinolampas cookei 
Echinolampas crassa 
Echinolampas cuvillieri 
Echinolampas daguini 
Echinolampas daralagezensis 
Echinolampas delorenzoi 
Echinolampas depressa 
Echinolampas deserticus 
Echinolampas dorsalis 
Echinolampas dubaleni 
Echinolampas ellipsoidalis 
Echinolampas eocenicus 
Echinolampas fraasi 
Echinolampas garciai 
Echinolampas garoensis 
Echinolampas gigas 
Echinolampas gignouxi 
Echinolampas globulossus 
Echinolampas gregoryi
Echinolampas guvarensis 
Echinolampas hanguensis 
Echinolampas hemisphaerica 
Echinolampas jacquemonti 
Echinolampas jacqueti 
Echinolampas jigniensis 
Echinolampas keiensis 
Echinolampas khariensis 
Echinolampas koreana 
Echinolampas kugleri 
Echinolampas lakiensis 
Echinolampas laubei 
Echinolampas leymeriei 
Echinolampas liae 
Echinolampas lipiformis 
Echinolampas lycopersicus 
Echinolampas macrostoma 
Echinolampas madurensis 
Echinolampas marcaisi 
Echinolampas marioi 
Echinolampas menchikoffi 
Echinolampas mestrei 
Echinolampas migiurtinus 
Echinolampas migliorinii 
Echinolampas migliorinii 
Echinolampas moronensis 
Echinolampas munozi 
Echinolampas neuvillei 
Echinolampas nuevitasensis 
Echinolampas omanensis 
Echinolampas ovata 
Echinolampas paraensis 
Echinolampas paragoga 
Echinolampas parvula 
Echinolampas percrassus 
Echinolampas perrieri 
Echinolampas peyroti 
Echinolampas pipurensis 
Echinolampas posterocrassa 
Echinolampas pyramidalis 
Echinolampas qattamiaensis 
Echinolampas rangii 
Echinolampas raulini 
Echinolampas rhodiensis 
Echinolampas rollandil 
Echinolampas rombellipsoidalis 
Echinolampas rotundus 
Echinolampas sandiegensis 
Echinolampas santaclarae 
Echinolampas schultzi 
Echinolampas semiorbis 
Echinolampas sternopetala 
Echinolampas strongyla 
Echinolampas subnucleus 
Echinolampas subrostratus 
Echinolampas sumatrana 
Echinolampas tachanabatensis 
Echinolampas tandoni 
Echinolampas tanypetalis 
Echinolampas tenuipetalum 
Echinolampas torrense 
Echinolampas tumulus 
Echinolampas umbella 
Echinolampas vadaszi 
Echinolampas valettei 
Echinolampas venzoi 
Echinolampas visedoi 
Echinolampas woodi 
Echinolampas woodringi 
Echinolampas yadongensis 
Echinolampas yoshiwarai

References

Echinoidea genera
Cassiduloida